A Sort of Homecoming is an American drama film directed by Maria Burton and starring Katherine McNamara, Laura Marano, Parker Mack, Michelle Clunie and Kathleen Wilhoite. It premiered March 14, 2015 at the Omaha Film Festival.

Plot
Amy Hartington returns to her home town in Louisiana from her career in New York City upon request of her high school debate coach. In flashbacks, she recalls her senior year, the politics surrounding debate competitions and her relationship with Nick (Parker Mack), her debate partner. Laura Marano told Twist Magazine, "At the core of it, A Sort of Homecoming is about this character finding herself, not only with her support system, but within herself."

Cast

 Michelle Clunie as Amy
Laura Marano as young Amy
 Parker Mack as Nick
 Katherine McNamara as Rosa
 Kathleen Wilhoite as Annie
 Jaqueline Fleming as Val	
 Lara Grice as Amy's mother
 Wayne Pére as Adam
 Ashlynn Ross as Melanie
 Shayne Topp as Dylan
 Morganna May as Susan Levine
 Lance E. Nichols as Hal
 Ritchie Montgomery as Amy's father
 Marcus Lyle Brown as Keith
 Jim Gleason as Bill Tarrity
 Neal Kodinsky as Victor

Production
Production for the film began in February 2014 and spanned much of the spring of that year. While a few scenes were shot in New Orleans, the majority were shot in Lafayette, Louisiana, hometown of the writer and producers.

Distribution 
After playing film festivals for most of 2015, A Sort of Homecoming was released digitally in the United States by MarVista Entertainment.

Awards and nomination

References

External links
 

2015 films
2015 drama films
American drama films
Films set in Louisiana
Films set in the 1980s
Films set in the 2010s
High school debate
Films about high school debate
2010s English-language films
2010s American films